Videoface Digitiser is a video digitiser interface for the ZX Spectrum home computer.  It was produced by Data-Skip from The Netherlands and later on by Romantic Robot UK Ltd from UK in 1987.  It was originally sold for GBP 69, but the price dropped to 30 GBP within few years. 

Videoface takes signal from any video source with composite video out capability. It produces a 256 × 192 pixel 4-bit screen.  Scanning speed is just below four frames per second.  These screens can be saved as single pictures or animations with variable speed, and later loaded into any drawing program for editing.  During scanning, the contrast of the picture can be adjusted by turning the knob on top of the Videoface, and the picture can be shifted horizontally and vertically.

External links

ZX Spectrum
Home computer peripherals